Carl Harald Brummer (12 July 1864 – 14 February 1953) was a Danish architect who was influential in the design of homes at the beginning of the 20th century.

Biography
Brummer was born in Bogense.  After attending the Danish Academy from 1888 to 1896, he worked for Ferdinand Meldahl and Hermann Baagøe Storck. He initially became known for Ellestuen, a freely designed country home which was quite different from conventional houses in Denmark. He soon became one of the leading Danish architects for designing private homes between the beginning of the 20th century and the First World War including Svanemøllevej 56 (1904) and Lundevangsvej 12 (1908), both in Copenhagen. He also drew on architecture from the late 18th century, for example in designing Heymans Villa in 1907 before adopting the Neoclassical style and experimenting with other approaches including simplified Functional designs which can be seen in Gurre Church (1918) and his own home (1920).  He died, aged 88, in Skovshoved.

References

See also
List of Danish architects

Danish architects
1864 births
1953 deaths
Recipients of the Eckersberg Medal
People from Nordfyn Municipality